Manaia is a locality on the western side of the Coromandel Peninsula of New Zealand. It lies to the east of State Highway 25, south of Coromandel and north of Tapu. The Manaia River flows from the Coromandel Range through the area and into the Manaia Harbour to the west. The harbour contains mussel farms.

The Manaia Forest Sanctuary, inland from Manaia, contains the sixth largest kauri tree in New Zealand. The Sanctuary contains about 410 kauri trees in an area of 101 hectares.

The local iwi are Ngāti Whanaunga and Ngāti Pūkenga.

Education
Manaia School is a coeducational full primary (years 1-8) school with a decile rating of 2 and a roll of 42. A Manaia School is first mentioned in a Department of Education report for 1878.

References

External links
 Manaia School website

Thames-Coromandel District
Populated places in Waikato
Populated places around the Hauraki Gulf / Tīkapa Moana